Mohamed "Real fighter" aka Machine Khamal (born July 15, 1990) is a Dutch-Moroccan welterweight Muay Thai kickboxer who fought out of Amsterdam, Netherlands for Vos Gym.  He is the K-1 World MAX 2010 West Europe champion, who competed in K-1 MAX and It's Showtime.

As of 1 October 2017, he is ranked the #10 lightweight in the world by CombatPress.com.

Biography and career
Khamal was born in 1990 in the Netherlands. After a number of Muay Thai fights in the Netherlands, and after picking up good wins against opposition such as Sergio Wielzen and Hassan Ait Bassou, Khamal made his mark on the international scene in 2009 when he faced Thai legend Anuwat Kaewsamrit for the W.M.C. Intercontinental title (64 kg).  The fight went the full five rounds, resulted in a unanimous decision victory for the 19-year-old fighter.  With this upset victory Khamal would make his name and he would begin to be known as one of the best prospects in the 63 kg division.

In 2010 Khamal moved up in weight to 70 kg and entered the K-1 World MAX 2010 West Europe Tournament in Utrecht, Netherlands in a bid to gain qualification for the 2010 K-1 World MAX.  Despite moving up in weight and being one of the events smaller fighters, Khamal made the final where he faced pre-tournament favourite Armenian-Belgium fighter Harut Grigorian.  In the final match Khamal dominated, dropping Harut twice before getting the victory via brutal KO in the second round and booking his place at the K-1 World MAX 2010 Final 16.

At the final 16 event Khamal was drawn against Artur Kyshenko - the K-1 World MAX 2008 runner up.  A heavy underdog going into the fight, Khamal outworked Kyshenko to take a unanimous decision victory and a place in the final 8 stage where he lost by decision to Gago Drago in the quarter finals.  At the end of 2010 Khamal fought close friend Mosab Amrani at the Fightclub presents: It's Showtime 2010 event, winning an extra round decision in what was a contender for the fight of the year.

On the 27th of May, 2012 Khamal fought Saiyok Pumpanmuang on Full Muay Thai rules. The event was held as part of the Netherlands vs Thailand show, hosted by Slamm!! Events. After a first round that saw both fighters feeling each other out, Khamal hit Saiyok with an elbow in the beginning of the second round. The elbow opened a big cut over the right eye of the Thai fighter, forcing the doctor to stop the fight. After the fight Khamal announced his retirement from the sport.

He then came out of retirement shortly later and was set to face Marat Grigorian at Glory 2: Brussels in Brussels, Belgium on October 6, 2012. However, he pulled out of this bout citing personal issues and was replaced by Alex Vogel.

Mohamed Khamal made his comeback against Sitthichai Sitsongpeenong (70 kg) at LEGEND 3 on 5 April 2014 in Milan., losing a UD.

Titles
2014 Real Fighters World Full Muay Thai Rules -70 kg Champion (1 Title Def.)
2010 K-1 World MAX West Europe Champion
2009 W.M.C. Muay thai Intercontinental Champion -64 kg
2007 M.O.N. Netherlands Amateur Muay thai (-64 kg) champion

Kickboxing record

|-
|-  bgcolor="#FFBBBB"
| 2018-06-23 || Loss ||align=left| Tayfun Özcan|| Enfusion 69|| Netherlands || TKO (Four Knockdowns/Right Hooks) || 3 || 1:40
|-
|-  bgcolor="#FFBBBB"
| 2017-12-08 || Loss||align=left| Endy Semeleer || Enfusion Live 58 - 72kg 8 Man Tournament, Semi Finals ||  Abu Dhabi, United Arab Emirates  || Decision  || 3 || 3:00
|-
|-  bgcolor="#CCFFCC"
| 2017-12-08 || Win ||align=left| Aziz Kallah || Enfusion Live 58 - 72kg 8 Man Tournament, Quarter Finals ||  Abu Dhabi, United Arab Emirates  || Decision (Unanimous) || 3 || 3:00
|-  bgcolor="#FFBBBB"
| 2017-09-30 || Loss ||align=left| Superbon Banchamek || Enfusion Live 53 || Antwerp, Belgium || Decision (Unanimous) ||  3|| 3:00
|-  bgcolor="#CCFFCC"
| 2017-03-18 || Win ||align=left| Jomthong Chuwattana || Enfusion Live 47 || Nijmegen, Netherlands  || Decision (Unanimous) || 3 || 3:00
|-  bgcolor="#FFBBBB"
| 2016-04-03 || Loss ||align=left| Andy Souwer || World Fighting League || Hoofddorp, Netherlands || Decision (Unanimous) ||  3|| 3:00 
|-
|-  bgcolor="#CCFFCC"
| 2015-12-06 || Win ||align=left| Erkan Varol || Real Fighters a night 2 remember || Hilversum, Netherlands || Decision || 5 || 3:00
|-
! style=background:white colspan=9 |
|-
|-  bgcolor="#CCFFCC"
| 2015-10-18 || Win ||align=left| Chahid Oulad El Hadj || World Fighting League "Unfinished Business" || Hoofddorp, Netherlands || KO || 2 || 
|-
|-  bgcolor="#CCFFCC"
| 2014-11-30 ||  Win  ||align=left| Kongfah Sitmonchai || Real Fighters a night 2 remember || Hilversum, Netherlands || Decision (Unanimous) || 5 || 3:00
|-
! style=background:white colspan=9 |
|-
|-  bgcolor="#FFBBBB"
| 2014-04-05 || Loss ||align=left| Sitthichai Sitsongpeenong || Legend 3: Pour Homme || Milan, Italy || Decision (unanimous) || 3 || 3:00
|-
|-  bgcolor="#CCFFCC"
| 2012-05-27 || Win ||align=left| Saiyok Pumpanmuang || SLAMM: Nederland vs. Thailand VII || Almere, Netherlands || TKO (Corner stop/cut by elbow) || 2 || 
|-
|-
|-  bgcolor="#CCFFCC"
| 2011-11-06 || Win ||align=left| Michael Dicks || Muay Thai Premier League: Round 3 || THe Hague, Netherlands || Decision (Unanimous) || 5 || 3:00
|-
|-  bgcolor="#CCFFCC"
| 2011-10-08 || Win ||align=left| Liam Harrison || Muaythai Premier League: Round 2 || Padua, Italy || Decision (Split) || 5 || 3:00
|-
|-  bgcolor="#CCFFCC"
| 2011-05-21 || Win ||align=left| Robin van Roosmalen || Fightclub presents: It's Showtime 2011 || Amsterdam, Netherlands || Decision (Split) || 3 || 3:00
|-  
|-  bgcolor="#CCFFCC"
| 2010-12-18 || Win ||align=left| Mosab Amrani || Fightclub presents: It's Showtime 2010 || Amsterdam, Netherlands || Ext.R Decision (4-1) || 4 || 3:00 
|-
|-  bgcolor="#FFBBBB"
| 2010-11-08 || Loss ||align=left| Gago Drago || K-1 World MAX 2010 Final, Quarter Finals || Tokyo, Japan || Decision (Unanimous) || 3 || 3:00
|-
|-  bgcolor="#CCFFCC"
| 2010-10-03 || Win ||align=left| Artur Kyshenko || K-1 World MAX 2010 Final 16 - Part 2 || Seoul, South Korea || Decision (Unanimous) || 3 || 3:00 
|-
! style=background:white colspan=9 |
|-
|-  bgcolor="#FFBBBB"
| 2010-07-24 || Loss ||align=left| Gianpiero Sportelli || Monopoli sul ring 2010 || Monopoli, Italy || Decision (5-0) || 3 || 3:00 
|-  bgcolor="#FFBBBB"
| 2010-05-29 || Loss ||align=left| Chahid Oulad El Hadj || It's Showtime 2010 Amsterdam || Amsterdam, Netherlands || Decision (5-0) || 3 || 3:00 
|-
|-  bgcolor="#CCFFCC"
| 2010-03-21 || Win ||align=left| Harut Grigorian || K-1 World MAX 2010 West Europe Tournament, Final || Utrecht, Netherlands || KO (Punch) || 2 || 
|-
! style=background:white colspan=9 |
|-
|-  bgcolor="#CCFFCC"
| 2010-03-21 || Win ||align=left| Robin van Roosmalen || K-1 World MAX 2010 West Europe Tournament, Semi Finals || Utrecht, Netherlands || KO || 1 || 3:00
|-
|-  bgcolor="#CCFFCC"
| 2010-03-21 || Win ||align=left| Chris van Venrooij || K-1 World MAX 2010 West Europe Tournament, Quarter Finals || Utrecht, Netherlands || Decision (Unanimous) || 3 || 3:00
|-
|-  bgcolor="#CCFFCC"
| 2009-11-29 || Win ||align=left| Anuwat Kaewsamrit || SLAMM "Nederland vs Thailand VI" || Almere, Netherlands || Decision (Unanimous) || 5 || 3:00
|-
! style=background:white colspan=9 |
|-
|-  bgcolor="#CCFFCC"
| 2009-07-25 || Win ||align=left| Eduardo Afonso || The Night of Stars || Tetouan, Morocco || Decision (Unanimous) || 3 || 3:00
|-  bgcolor="#CCFFCC"
| 2009-05-31 || Win ||align=left| Mo Charkaoui || Next Generation Warriors III || Utrecht, Netherlands || KO || 1 || 
|-  bgcolor="#CCFFCC"
| 2009-04-11 || Win ||align=left| Hassan Ait Bassou || Amsterdam Fightclub || Amsterdam, Netherlands || Decision (Unanimous) || 3 || 3:00
|-
|-  bgcolor="#CCFFCC"
| 2008-11-08 || Win ||align=left| Sergio Wielzen || Ice Cold Assassins || Amsterdam, Netherlands || TKO || 4 ||
|-  bgcolor="#CCFFCC"
| 2008-10-04 || Win ||align=left| Atty Gol || Muay Thai gala || Didam, Netherlands || Disqualification || ||
|-  bgcolor="#CCFFCC"
| 2008-09-28 || Win ||align=left| Delon Carrilho || WPKL Gala Rotterdam || Rotterdam, Netherlands || Decision (Unanimous) || 5 || 3:00
|-  bgcolor="#CCFFCC"
| 2008-04-19 || Win ||align=left| Brahim Kamel || Muay Thai Gala, Sporthal Zilvermeeuwen || Zaandam, Netherlands || Decision (Unanimous) || 3 || 3:00
|-  bgcolor="#c5d2ea"
| 2008-02-24 || Draw ||align=left| Jan Pruimboom || Muay Thai gala Veghel || Veghel, Netherlands || Decision draw|| 5 || 2:00
|-  bgcolor="#FFBBBB"
| 2007-11-03 || Loss ||align=left| Sergio Wielzen || Beatdown V, @ Zonnehuis || Amsterdam, Netherlands || Decision (Unanimous) || 5 || 2:00
|-  bgcolor="#CCFFCC"
| 2007-09-01 || Win ||align=left| Romano Morjoner || Kumiteé Everybody Gym || Hilversum, Netherlands || Decision (Unanimous) || 5 || 2:00
|-  bgcolor="#c5d2ea"
| 2007-06-30 || Draw ||align=left| Suleyman Kasmi || NSK Holland vs Belgium || Delft, Netherlands || Decision draw|| 5 || 2:00
|-  bgcolor="#CCFFCC"
| 2007-05-27 || Win ||align=left| Reinout Sterk || M.O.N. Netherlands Amateur Championships "Fighting to Thailand" || Drachten, Netherlands || Decision || 5 || 2:00
|-
! style=background:white colspan=9 |
|-
|-  bgcolor="#CCFFCC"
| 2007-05-19 || Win ||align=left| Mohamed Lahmaj || Muaythai Gala "Fighting Nordin Memorial III" || Purmerend, Netherlands || KO || 3 || 
|-  bgcolor="#CCFFCC"
| 2007-05-12 || Win ||align=left| Fouad Zeknikni || Fighting with the Stars || Hilversum, Netherlands || KO (Knee strike) || 2 || 
|-  bgcolor="#CCFFCC"
| 2007-04-14 || Win ||align=left| Aziz el Mamouni || Shima events, Sporthal Zilvermeeuwen || Zaandam, Netherlands || Decision (Unanimous) || 5 || 2:00
|-  bgcolor="#CCFFCC"
| 2007-04-01 || Win ||align=left| Redouan Moutqane || Homeboys I || Oostzaan, Netherlands || Decision (Unanimous) || 3 || 2:00
|-  bgcolor="#CCFFCC"
| 2007-03-03 || Win ||align=left| Nabil Kamrani || Fight Night Amsterdam, Zonnehuis || Amsterdam, Netherlands || Decision (Unanimous) || 3 || 2:00
|-  bgcolor="#CCFFCC"
| 2007-02-10 || Win ||align=left| Abdel Salam || Beatdown IV || Amsterdam, Netherlands || Decision (Unanimous) || 3 || 2:00
|-  bgcolor="#CCFFCC"
| 2006-12-16 || Win ||align=left| Abdel Salam || Fight4Life gala || Netherlands || Decision (Unanimous) || 3 || 2:00
|-  bgcolor="#CCFFCC"
| 2006-11-26 || Win ||align=left| Hoessein Hayoutti || Victory or Hell, Sportcentrum Van Hogendorp || Amsterdam, Netherlands || Decision (Unanimous) || 2 || 2:00
|-  bgcolor="#c5d2ea"
| 2006-10-07 || Draw ||align=left| Isaias Ferreira || Muaythai All Style Gala Martial Arts part II || Leek, Netherlands || Decision draw || 2 || 2:00
|-  bgcolor="#CCFFCC"
| 2006-06-18 || Win ||align=left| Azedinne Bouzammour || Kickbox gala Antwerpen || Antwerp, Belgium || Decision (Unanimous) || 2 || 2:00
|-  bgcolor="#CCFFCC"
| 2006-05-20 || Win ||align=left| Abdel Stitou || Muaythai Gala "Talent Scout" || Purmerend, Netherlands || Decision (Unanimous) || 2 || 1:30
|-  bgcolor="#CCFFCC"
| 2006-03-04 || Win ||align=left| Doguhan Sonbahar || Muaythai Jeugd Gala - Youth Force Zone III || Amsterdam, Netherlands || Decision (Unanimous) || 2 || 1:30
|-
|-
| colspan=9 | Legend:

See also
List of K-1 events
List of male kickboxers

References

External links
 Mootje Khamal - Hyves.nl (Dutch Language Website)

1990 births
Living people
Dutch male kickboxers
Moroccan male kickboxers
Welterweight kickboxers
Dutch Muay Thai practitioners
Moroccan Muay Thai practitioners
Dutch sportspeople of Moroccan descent
Sportspeople from Amsterdam